Pseudodrassus is a genus of ground spiders that was first described by Lodovico di Caporiacco in 1935.

Species
 it contains four species:
Pseudodrassus pichoni Schenkel, 1963 – China
Pseudodrassus quadridentatus (Caporiacco, 1928) – Libya
Pseudodrassus ricasolii Caporiacco, 1935 (type) – Turkey
Pseudodrassus scorteccii Caporiacco, 1936 – Libya

References

Araneomorphae genera
Gnaphosidae
Spiders of Africa
Spiders of Asia